is a Tokyu Meguro Line station located in Shinagawa, Tokyo, Japan.

Station layout
This station consists of one island platform serving two tracks. Only local trains stop at this station.

Traffic

History
 1 August 1928 - Opening
 2 July 2006 - Opened as an underground station

References

Tokyu Meguro Line
Railway stations in Tokyo